Pugh's Mill Covered Bridge is a registered historic structure near Oxford, Ohio, listed in the National Register on 1975-06-05. This wooden bridge was built in 1869 over Four Mile (Talawanda) Creek and is one of two remaining covered bridges in Butler County, Ohio. The other is the Bebb Park or State Line covered bridge built in 1868.

References

External links
Black -Pugh's Mill- Covered Bridge
Gigapan image of Black -Pugh's Mill- Covered Bridge

Covered bridges on the National Register of Historic Places in Ohio
Transportation buildings and structures in Butler County, Ohio
National Register of Historic Places in Butler County, Ohio
Tourist attractions in Butler County, Ohio
Bridges completed in 1869
Wooden bridges in Ohio
1869 establishments in Ohio
Road bridges on the National Register of Historic Places in Ohio